Martin Kližan was the defending champion, but had to compete in the 2013 Rogers Cup instead.

Seeds

Draw

Finals

Top half

Bottom half

References
 Main Draw
 Qualifying Draw

San Marino CEPU Open - Singles
San Marino CEPU Open